The Bonn–Bamberg basketbrawl describes a violent altercation between players of the German Bundesliga basketball clubs Telekom Baskets Bonn and GHP Bamberg which took place in the 2006 BBL playoff series on May 4, 2006. Fourteen players were ejected, and one fouled out, making that game the probably only playoff game in professional basketball history that ended as a 3-on-4 match.

The disturbance
The second match of the playoff series between Bonn and Bamberg was played in Bonn. With Bonn trailing 21-14 after 13 minutes, Uvis Helmanis (Bamberg) committed a hard foul against Michael Meeks (Bonn) without the referees whistling. In the next play, Meeks scythed Helmanis, prompting Steffen Hamann (Bamberg) to face Meeks and punch him to the ground. In the following 20 minute bench-clearing brawl, almost every player and many team officials stormed onto the court. Thirteen players were ejected; the game could only carry on as a 4-on-5 with Bamberg being short-handed.

The Bamberg team used a 2:2 zone defense against the Bonn team, who were in a perpetual power play situation. It worked surprisingly well, as long as the four players still had some energy left. The Bonn team had the privilege of being able to use a libero (similar to free-roaming defensive positions in  association football and volleyball), but were unable to capitalize on this until the last quarter: the shorthanded Bamberg team led 45–30 at half time, managed to end the third quarter still in front with 52–50 and took a 61–60 lead minutes away from the end, however, then exhaustion took its toll.  Bonn drained shot after shot and shut down Bamberg's offense, because of the advantage of the extra player.

The match reached its absurd climax seconds before the game ended. A Bamberg player fouled out, and Bamberg coach Dirk Bauermann was ejected after receiving his second technical foul for abusing officials. In frustration, the Bamberg player who fouled out pushed another Bonn player, and he shoved him back in retaliation. The referees ejected the Bonn player and the match ended as a 3-on-4 with Bonn winning 75–64.

Suspensions and criminal charges
Most of the players avoided long bans, but Helmanis, Meeks and Hamann received longer bans lasting up to six matches.

See also
Pacers–Pistons brawl
Knicks–Nuggets brawl

References 
Play by Play Account
Account from Bonn POV
Account from the Bamberg POV
German Referee Association file
Berliner Zeitung
RP Online
n-TV

2005–06 in German basketball
Basketball controversies
Brawls in team sports
Telekom Baskets Bonn